American International School of Libreville (AISL) is an American international school in Libreville, Gabon. The U.S. Embassy in Gabon sponsors the school. It serves grades pre-kindergarten through grade 12, and was founded in 1975 at the request of the U.S. Ambassador to Gabon, Andrew Lee Steigman. The school's student body for the year 2015–2016 was 26. As of 2015, there were no eleventh and twelfth graders at the school.

See also

 Education in Gabon
 List of international schools

References

External links
 , the school's official website

1975 establishments in Gabon
American international schools in Africa
Buildings and structures in Libreville
Educational institutions established in 1975
Elementary and primary schools in Gabon
International high schools
International schools in Gabon
High schools and secondary schools in Gabon